Fortaleza de Santa Cruz de Anhatomirim is a fort located on Anhatomirim Island in the municipality of Governador Celso Ramos, Santa Catarina in Brazil.

See also
Military history of Brazil

References

External links

Santa Cruz
Buildings and structures in Santa Catarina (state)
Portuguese colonial architecture in Brazil
1739 establishments in Portugal
1730s establishments in Brazil